Mount Buller may refer to:

Mount Buller, Victoria, a town on Mt Buller (the mountain) in Australia
Mount Buller (Victoria), a mountain in Australia
Mount Buller Alpine Resort, ski resort located on Mount Buller (the mountain) in Australia
Mount Buller (Alberta), a mountain in Canada